Manphibian is a fictional character appearing in American comic books published by Marvel Comics. He has some resemblance to the "Gill Man" seen in Creature from the Black Lagoon.

Publication history

Manphibian first appeared in Legion of Monsters #1 and was created by Marv Wolfman, Tony Isabella, Dave Cockrum, and Sam Grainger.

Fictional character biography
Manphibian's alien species did not suffer the delusional concept of fate. They did not reinvent such calamities in their own minds as a call to a righteous and vital missions like a hunt for revenge. They realized the true motive for such actions was to share their own pain with the world.

Manphibian's kind believed in a "Prime Mover" where they have not raised a hand against another of their kind for eons. This was until Manphibian's mate was murdered by someone from Manphibian's species. After his elders denied him revenge, Manphibian pursued the murderer into space. Manphibian's search took him across different planets until landing on Earth thousands of years ago. Many years later, oil drillers woke up the murderous member of Manphibian's race. When Manphibian arrived, he stopped the creature from attacking Beth Fox. Their fight lasted until a missile strike destroyed Shaft #27. Due to Beth Fox being traumatized, her husband Aaron Fox vowed revenge and started hunting both creatures.

Manphibian and his mate had multiple offspring that were simultaneously trapped on Earth. Due to the death of his mate, Manphibian had to raise them on his own.

At some point, Manphibian was recruited by S.H.I.E.L.D. in order to be part of Nick Fury's Howling Commandos. Manphibian was seen in Area 13's commissary alongside John Jameson and Golem. Manphibian was with the Howling Commandos when they launched an assault on the forces of Merlin.

Deacon and Blackout considered Manphibian as a possible candidate to fight Ghost Rider.

When Robert Hellsgard's Hunter of Monster Special Force began hunting down and slaughtering any being they deemed a monster, Manphibian joined up with the Legion of Monsters to defend those from being attacked by the Hunter of Monster Special Force. The Legion of Monsters led the survivors to the abandoned Morlock tunnels beneath Manhattan which had been a haven for monsters centuries earlier. The Legion of Monsters converted the haven into Monster Metropolis where it is feared to be the last stand against the Hunter of Monster Special Force.

Manphibian's children couldn't join Manphibian in Monster Metropolis as their bodies need clean water and the catacombs near Monster Metropolis have a short supply of clean water. After Punisher was slain by Wolverine's son Daken, Manphibian was present when the Moloids brought Punisher's remains to Morbius, the Living Vampire who revived Punisher as a Frankenstein's monster-like creature called FrankenCastle. Manphibian stated that Punisher had been reborn wild as he cautions his fellow Legion of Monsters. It took the Legion of Monsters to subdue Punisher so that they can finish fixing his brain. Manphibian left Monster Metropolis to check up on his children and was captured by the Hunter of Monster Special Force. Manphibian was transported to the Hunter of Monster Special Force's base in the Alps where they tortured him to give up the location of Monster Metropolis. Robert Hellsgard tortured Manphibian, trying to get him to provide the location to the monster refuge; however, he resisted the torture.  Hellsgard finally showed him the corpses of Manphibian's children, stating that they had given up the location during their own torture session- his torture of Manphibian had been for his own perverse pleasure. Following the attack on Monster Metropolis, FrankenCastle raided the Hunter of Monster Special Force's base to rescue Manphibian and the other captive monsters. Robert Hellsgard engaged the Legion of Monsters where he used a buzzsaw on Manphibian's chest and blasted FrankenCastle in the face. Manphibian managed to get to his feet and rejoins the battle. When the group ends up transported to Limbo, Manphibian manages to haul Robert Hellsgard out of his body armor after he was knocked down. FrankenCastle stopped Manphibian from killing Hellsgard as revenge for the murder of his children. Manphibian stated that he is nothing like Robert Hellsgard and is above killing for petty vengeance. When the portal to Earth opened, FrankenCastle, Manphibian, and Morbius returned to Earth while leaving Robert Hellsgard in Limbo.  Hellsgard thanked FrankenCastle for his mercy, to which Castle sardonically replied, "Yeah, right... Mercy".

Back at Monster Metropolis, Manphibian was badly injured from the battle and was bandaged up. After FrankenCastle was healed, Manphibian led FrankenCastle to Monster Metropolis' cells where the captive members of the Hunter of Monster Special Force soldiers are being held and did not know what to do with them. As no court would prosecute them, Manphibian asked FrankenCastle what should be done with them. As FrankenCastle handed Manphibian a gun and walked away, Manphibian had no intent to use it on them. Following FrankenCastle's rampage in Tokyo, Manphibian was with the Legion of Monsters when it comes to helping Elsa Bloodstone lure FrankenCastle to Monster Island.

Manphibian and Morbius helped N'Kantu, the Living Mummy and Werewolf by Night capture the Dimensional Man. Elsa Bloodstone teleported into Monster Metropolis with a dead monster that was taken into custody. It was soon revealed that the dead monster was corrupted by a powerful force.

When Red Hulk journeyed to Monster Metropolis, Manphibian helped Red Hulk and Werewolf by Night overcome panicked monsters in order to stop the ghost of Doc Samson's bad side. Manphibian and the Legion of Monsters helped Red Hulk and Doctor Strange defeat the ghost of Doc Samson's bad side.

Manphibian joined the Legion of Monsters into evacuating Brownville so that Morbius can confront Rose who is wielding a makeshift Ultimate Nullifier. Manphibian was the one who kept Morbius' friend Becky Barnes safe. Following Morbius' wish that Becky Barnes would be kept safe, Manphibian carried Becky Barnes away from the wreckage to keep her safe.

Manphibian was one of several beings (along with the Uncanny Avengers) captured by Mojo to appear in one of Mojo's films. He was paired up with Blade, Doctor Strange, Ghost Rider, Man-Thing, and Satana as the Avengers of the Supernatural.

As part of the All-New, All-Different Marvel event, Manphibian appears as a member of S.T.A.K.E.'s Howling Commandos.

Manphibian was with the Howling Commandos at the time when they help Old Man Logan rescue Jubilee from Dracula.

Powers and abilities

Manphibian possesses superhuman strength which is enough to tear a fifteen-foot tree from the ground. Manphibian also has sharp claws and its skin is strong enough to withstand missiles.

Reception
The Manphibian was ranked #28 on a listing of Marvel Comics' monster characters in 2015.

References

External links
 Manphibian at Marvel Wiki
 Manphibian at Comic Vine
 

Characters created by Dave Cockrum
Characters created by Marv Wolfman
Characters created by Tony Isabella
Comics characters introduced in 1975
Fictional amphibians
Fictional monsters
Howling Commandos
Marvel Comics aliens
Marvel Comics characters with accelerated healing
Marvel Comics characters with superhuman strength
Marvel Comics extraterrestrial superheroes
Marvel Comics male superheroes